The Skirball Fire was a wildfire that burned in the Bel Air neighborhood of Los Angeles, California, United States, and one of multiple wildfires that broke out across Southern California in December 2017. The fire burned 422 acres (171 ha) of land on the slopes of the Sepulveda Pass on its east or Bel Air side, causing the closure of Interstate 405 (as well as the parallel Sepulveda Boulevard), a major traffic artery in the city. The Skirball Cultural Center, Bel-Air Country Club, Getty Center, Santa Monica-Malibu Unified School District, and various private schools were closed as a result of the fire. Classes were cancelled at the University of California, Los Angeles (UCLA) and Santa Monica College, while Mount Saint Mary's University evacuated from its Brentwood campus to its downtown Los Angeles location. The fire destroyed six structures and damaged 12. On December 10, at about 1 p.m. PST, all evacuation orders and road closures for the Skirball Fire were lifted, as containment of the wildfire increased to 85%.

On December 12, it was reported on that the fire had been sparked by an illegal cooking fire at a homeless encampment within the pass.

During the Skirball Fire, firefighters in the LAFD employed drones to help them combat wildfires for the first time.

This fire threatened the home of Frank Luntz, the Republican political consultant who had previously sought to downplay the severity of the climate change crisis. He later cited this experience as an "example of the climate crisis made personal," and shifted his viewpoint to advocate for climate action.

Containment progress

See also
 2017 California wildfires
 December 2017 Southern California wildfires
 Bel Air Fire (1961)
 October 2007 California wildfires
 Sayre Fire

References

External links
 SDSC WiFire Interactive Map—San Diego Supercomputer Center
 Recording of LAFD initial attack radio communications

2017 California wildfires
2017 in Los Angeles
Bel Air, Los Angeles
December 2017 events in the United States
December 2017 Southern California wildfires
Environment of Greater Los Angeles
University of California, Los Angeles
Wildfires in Los Angeles County, California